Martin Dohlsten (born 29 April 1986) is a Swedish footballer, currently playing for UMF Selfoss. He moved to the club in the July transfer window 2010 from Örgryte IS.

External links
  
 
 

1986 births
Living people
GAIS players
Örgryte IS players
Swedish footballers
Association football midfielders